Kuttichal (formerly known as Mannoorkara) is a village in Thiruvananthapuram district in the state of Kerala, India. The Kuttichal panchayath has borders with Aryanad, Poovachal, Kallikkad, panchayaths and Thiruneveli District of Tamil Nadu India. Kuttichal is part of Kattakada Taluk, Vellanad block panchayath and Aruvikkara Legislative Assembly. Kuttichal also has the kottor Elephant rehabilitation centre which is famous among tourists.

Kuttichal is a village town lying under the foothills of the Agastyarkudam of the Sahya Mountains. The town is situated nearly 30 km East from Thiruvananthapuram, 14 km South from Nedumangad and 8 km North from Kattakkada. In beauty and all other aspects this is a typical Kerala model village. This is purely an agricultural oriented Panchayath; Coconut, Rubber, Tapioca, Banana and Vegetables are the main farming items.
This Grama Panchayat consists of 14 wards and the people of all groups are living in harmony. Through this the State Highway road Nedumangad-Shorlakkodu SH3 (Tamil Nadu) runs. This road will become a part of new project The Hill Highway or Malayora Highway or newly named State Highway 59 (SH59)

Wards 
The Kuttichal panchyath is divided into fourteen wards such as,

Kuttichal 
Pachakkad 
Arukil 
Utharamkode 
Kodukkara 
Elimala 
Chonampara 
Kottoor 
Kalliyal 
Manthikulam 
Thachancode 
Paruthippally
Kaithakkal 
Pezhummood

Heritage sites 
There are several heritage sites, for example Dharma Sastha temple, Paruthippally Shiva temple, Paruthippally Church (Kuttichal, estd. 1840), one of the first Lutheran Churches in Kerala is in Kuttichal, St Joachim's Church(Thachancode,estd. 1930, Latin diocese of Neyyattinkara), Assemblies of God USA Churches. Siddhasramam Mannoorkara (Kuttichal), Jumah Masjid.

Offices and institutions 
The Paruthippally rage office under the office have 41.4110sq.km forest area this is the one of three rage office in Trivandrum district division forest, Regional Wild Life Sanctuary Office. There are also major educational institutions such as Govt. V. & H.S.S. Paruthippally estd 1915, and the Lourdes Matha College of Science and Technology, PHC Hospital, Agriculture office, Tribal office etc.

Tourism 

Kuttichal is famous place for travel and tourism.

The Agasthiyar Koodam Peak is in Kuttichal Village and belongs to Kottoor Forest division, Kottoor Kappukadu Elephant Rehabilitation Centre, The Kottoor Forest, Malavila Forest etc. are the main tourist destinations in Trivandrum District.
Cradled in the arms of the Agasthyakoodam Hill Range in the Western Ghats is the exotic destination- Kottoor. Covered with forests, this area is a hotbed of rare flora and fauna. The area is marked with tall forest tree species and numerous rivulets and streams. It is an integral part of the Agasthyakoodam Biological Park and visitors are allowed to visit 1.5 km past the forest check point. Here we encounter the famous watch tower. The view here is legendary as we get a spectacular glimpse of Thottumpara, Kathirumundi, Agasthyakoodam and Pandipathu peaks along with the Ponmudi hill resort.

Elephants can be spotted in these parts as well. The trail to the watchtower is said to be frequented by these majestic animals that have become accustomed to human presence. These forests are also home to many tribal establishments as well. Beyond the watch tower, the places to visit include Mankode, Chonanpara and Anchu Nazhikathodu leading all the way to the Peppara Dam Project area. One needs permission from the forest department before being allowed access to these parts.

Those who do venture into Anchu Nazhikathodu have a greater chance of spotting elephant herds. You can see wild boar, nilgiri langur, giant squirrel, bear, bison, sambar, jungle fowl, grey hornbill and a vivid range of butterflies here. The area is also renowned for its rich variety of medicinal plants.

Elephant lovers can visit the nearby rehabilitation centre at Kappukad. Here you can see aged elephants and young ones alike, dwelling in peace in a safe haven designed especially for them. A twenty minute elephant safari can be availed between 1100 and 1700 hours. The safari is of twenty minutes duration at Rs.100 per person.

Festivals 

Shivarathri procession from paruthippally to melemukku, kariyod, kuttichal. The karthika (കാർത്തിക ) festival in siddhasramam Mannoorkara (kuttichal).

References

External links

Villages in Thiruvananthapuram district